The College of Veterinary Science and Animal Husbandry, Sardarkrushinagar was established on 17 January 1981. This college is now part of Sardarkrushinagar Dantiwada Agricultural University, Gujarat, India.

Universities and colleges in Gujarat
Veterinary schools in India
Educational institutions established in 1981
Animal husbandry in Gujarat
1981 establishments in Gujarat